SmartLynx Airlines Estonia is an Estonian charter airline and a wholly owned subsidiary of the Latvian SmartLynx Airlines.

History
The airline commenced operations in 2012 with aircraft from its parent company and since gradually acquired its own fleet. As of June 2015, the subsidiary employed 40 people.

Fleet

As of December 2022, the SmartLynx Airlines Estonia fleet consists of the following aircraft:

Accidents and incidents 
On 28 February 2018, a SmartLynx Estonia Airbus A320-200 (registered ES-SAN) whilst operating for SmartLynx Estonia Flight 9001, was a training flight for 4 new student pilots. Aboard the flight was also an Instructor, a second pilot and a Civil Aviation Administration Inspector. The flight had to do 5 touch-and-go cycles and 2 full stop landings for each student. While one of the student pilots were controlling the aircraft, they lifted the joystick back, however the aircraft ceased to respond. It soon gained altitude and thereafter rapidly lost it and Engine #2 hit the runway and again gained altitude. The aircraft also was not responding to several flight inputs. Shortly after, Engine #2 flamed out and failed and during final approach Engine #1 also flamed out and failed. The safety pilot recognized the problem in time and the instructor took control from the trainee. The aircraft touched-down hard 150m from the runway. No one aboard was killed, however there was severe damage to the aircraft and it was subsequently written off.

References

External links

 

Airlines of Estonia
Airlines established in 2012
2012 establishments in Estonia